Trigonopterus paraflorensis is a species of flightless weevil in the genus Trigonopterus from Indonesia.

Etymology
The specific name is derived from the Greek word para-, meaning "next to", combined with the specific name of the related species T. florensis.

Description
Individuals measure 1.70–2.20 mm in length.  General coloration is black, with rust-colored legs and head.

Range

Phylogeny
T. paraflorensis is part of the T. relictus species group.  It bears morphological similarities to T. florensis and T. pseudoflorensis.

References

paraflorensis
Beetles described in 2014
Beetles of Asia
Insects of Indonesia